Nicolas Vernhes is a French record producer, recording engineer and record label owner. He is best known for his work with the American indie rock acts Animal Collective, Deerhunter, The Fiery Furnaces, Dirty Projectors, Wild Nothing and The War on Drugs.

Vernhes operates out of his own studio, Rare Book Room Studios, in Brooklyn, New York.

Biography
Vernhes was raised in Paris, France, before moving to the United States at a young age: "I grew up in Paris and moved to the states when I was 12. I ended up in New York at 20 to finish college, thinking I might go back to France afterwards and knew I could not go back before living here. I never left."

Discography

References

Living people
French record producers
French audio engineers
Year of birth missing (living people)
Place of birth missing (living people)